Cranston High School West (often called West, Cranston West or abbreviated as CHSW)  is a public high school located in Cranston, Rhode Island, United States.
The school comprises five buildings; one of these buildings is the Cranston Area Career and Technical Center. The school grounds include six tennis courts, a baseball field, and a track and football field. West has 155 staff members who work with the student population of approximately 1850 daily.  The program of studies encompasses 203 different courses. The Cranston Area Career and Technical Center offers 17 different courses. All courses are geared toward student academic abilities. Fifty-two percent of graduates go on to pursue a four-year degree while twenty-two percent pursue a 2-year degree.

Numerous athletic teams have won championship titles for the school, more recently being the 2004 varsity football team, 2006 varsity wrestling team, 2007 varsity wrestling team, 2008 varsity wrestling team, 2009 varsity wrestling team, 2006 varsity baseball team, 2007 varsity baseball team, 2009 varsity hockey team, 2011 varsity baseball team, and 2012 varsity boys tennis team.  Also the varsity boys volleyball team made it to the semifinals of the State titles in 2011, 2012, 2014, and 2015 while winning the State Championship in 2016 and 2019. The 2017 boys swim team were the division three dual meet champions. It is also the high school of former NFL Pro Bowl running back Mark Van Eeghen.

Ahlquist v. Cranston

On April 4, 2011, 10th-grade student Jessica Ahlquist filed a federal lawsuit aimed at ending the school's display of a prayer on a banner.
District Court Judge Ronald R. Lagueux issued a decision in favor of Jessica on January 11, 2012.  The decision was in part based on the Establishment Clause of the First Amendment, and the Lemon v. Kurtzman, Lynch v. Donnelly, and Lee v. Weisman US Supreme Court cases. 
Upon learning of the results of the case, some residents of Cranston, and others opposed to the decision and to Jessica's atheism, took their anger out on Jessica on Twitter and Facebook, and local florists refused to deliver to her.

Notable alumni 
 Monty Are I - an alternative rock band named after Arthur Montanaro, a teacher at West.
 Mark van Eeghen - former NFL Pro Bowl running back; only person from Cranston West to have number retired in any sport.
 Marissa Castelli - figure skater, 2-time national pairs champion; bronze medalist in 2014 Winter Olympics.
 JVKE - American singer-songwriter, producer, and social media personality (born 2001)
 Katelyn Bouyssou - member of the US Judo national team; 3 time US Judo national champion.

References

External links

Buildings and structures in Cranston, Rhode Island
Schools in Providence County, Rhode Island
Public high schools in Rhode Island